Millwood Colored School, now known as Millwood Community Center, is a historic school building for African-American children located at Boyce, Clarke County, Virginia.  It was built about 1910, and is a one-story, hip-roofed school has a two-room plan with coat closets, and a kitchen. The building measures approximately 60 feet long and 30 feet wide.  It features a recessed entry, two entrance doors, overhanging eaves with scalloped exposed rafter ends, double-hung windows with wooden tracery, five-panel doors, and sits on a limestone foundation.  It was used as an elementary school until 1952, then sold to the Millwood Good Will Association for use as a community center.

It was listed on the National Register of Historic Places in 2000.

References

African-American history of Virginia
School buildings on the National Register of Historic Places in Virginia
National Register of Historic Places in Clarke County, Virginia
School buildings completed in 1910
Schools in Clarke County, Virginia